The Revue des études byzantines is an annual peer-reviewed academic journal covering the study of Greek Christianity and especially Byzantine civilization. It was established in 1897 as Échos d'Orient, renamed Études byzantines in (with volume numbering restarting at 1), and obtaining its current title in 1946. The journal is published by Peeters on behalf of the Institut français d'études byzantines (Paris) and the editor-in-chief is Olivier Delouis.

Abstracting and indexing
The journal is abstracted and indexed in:

References

External links

Publications established in 1897
History journals
Multilingual journals
Peeters Publishers academic journals
Annual journals